A penumbral lunar eclipse will take place on 20–21 February 2027.

Visibility 
It will be completely visible over Africa, Europe and western Asia, will be seen rising over most of the Americas, and setting over eastern Asia and western Australia.

Related eclipses

Eclipses in 2027
 An annular solar eclipse on 6 February.
 A penumbral lunar eclipse on 20 February.
 A penumbral lunar eclipse on 18 July.
 A total solar eclipse on 2 August.
 A penumbral lunar eclipse on 17 August.

Lunar year series

Saros series 

It is part of Saros cycle 143.

Metonic cycle (19 years) 

This is the last of five Metonic lunar eclipses.

Half-Saros cycle
A lunar eclipse will be preceded and followed by solar eclipses by 9 years and 5.5 days (a half saros). This lunar eclipse is related to two partial solar eclipses of Solar Saros 150.

See also 
List of lunar eclipses and List of 21st-century lunar eclipses

References

External links 
 Saros cycle 143
 

2027-02
2027-02
2027 in science